G. princeps may refer to:
 Grallator princeps, a species in the ichnogenus Grallator
 Gaussia princeps (disambiguation)
 Gynoplistia princeps, a crane fly species in the genus Gynoplistia